Glenea enganensis is a species of beetle in the family Cerambycidae. It was described by Stephan von Breuning in 1982. It is found on Enggano Island.

References

enganensis
Beetles described in 1982